Elachista bilobella is a moth of the family Elachistidae that is found in Western Australia.

The forewings and hindwings are grey.

References

Moths described in 2011
Endemic fauna of Australia
bilobella
Moths of Australia
Taxa named by Lauri Kaila